Sophie Frances Cooke (born 27 June 1993), known mononymously as Frances, is a British singer and songwriter from Newbury, Berkshire, England.

Early life
Born in Oxford, she grew up in Newbury and attended St Gabriel's School in nearby Sandleford. She later studied music at the Liverpool Institute for Performing Arts.

Career
In August 2014, she was the featured artist for the track "Fire May Save You" for the French music label Kitsuné. The single was released as part of an EP, which contained remixes of the same track. In July 2015, she released the EP Grow for Communion Records. In October 2015, she released the EP Let It Out.

In November 2015, she was shortlisted for the 2016 BRIT Awards: Critics' Choice Award. In December 2015, she was nominated for the BBC Sound of 2016.

In 2016, she portrayed Katter the Butterfly singing "In My Life" in Beat Bugs episode 10b.

Discography

Studio albums

Singles

Songwriting and production discography

Awards and nominations

References

External links
Official website

1993 births
Living people
English women singer-songwriters
musicians from Oxford
People from Newbury, Berkshire
21st-century English women singers
21st-century English singers